San Diego is a municipality in the Zacapa Department in Guatemala.

Municipalities of the Zacapa Department